William Aguirre Villaviconcio (born 27 December 1962) is a Nicaraguan long-distance runner. He competed in the men's marathon at the 1992 Summer Olympics and the 1996 Summer Olympics.

References

External links
 

1962 births
Living people
Athletes (track and field) at the 1992 Summer Olympics
Athletes (track and field) at the 1996 Summer Olympics
Nicaraguan male long-distance runners
Nicaraguan male marathon runners
Olympic athletes of Nicaragua
Athletes (track and field) at the 1983 Pan American Games
Athletes (track and field) at the 1991 Pan American Games
Pan American Games competitors for Nicaragua
World Athletics Championships athletes for Nicaragua
Place of birth missing (living people)
Central American Games gold medalists for Nicaragua
Central American Games medalists in athletics
Olympic male marathon runners